Patricia Wells (born 5 November 1946 in Milwaukee, Wisconsin) is a cookbook author  and teacher.

Biography
She divides her time between Paris and Provence. She is the author of numerous food-related books. Her book Patricia Wells at Home in Provence (1996) won the James Beard Award for Best International Cookbook.  Wells is the only American and the only woman to be a restaurant critic for a major French publication, L'Express (1988–1991).

She was the restaurant critic for the International Herald Tribune from 1980 until 2007.

Books
The Food Lover's Guide to Paris (1984)
The Food Lover's Guide to France (1987)
Bistro Cooking (1989)
Simply French (1991)
Patricia Wells' Trattoria (1993)
Patricia Wells at Home in Provence (1996)
L'Atélier of Joel Robuchon (1998)
The Paris Cookbook (2001)
The Provence Cookbook (2004)
Vegetable Harvest (2007)
We've Always Had Paris ... And Provence (2008) with Walter Wells

References

External links
Patricia Wells Online

American food writers
American chefs
Living people
International Herald Tribune people
American restaurant critics
1946 births
Women food writers
Women cookbook writers
James Beard Foundation Award winners
American women non-fiction writers
21st-century American women